Carè Alto is a mountain in the Italian Alps, near Trento, above the San Valentino valley. It is a mountain of the Adamello-Presanella Group in the provinces of Trentino and Brescia and is part of the Southern Limestone Alps.

See also
 List of mountains of the Alps

References

Mountains of Trentino
Mountains of the Alps
Alpine three-thousanders